Kendayan, or Salako (Selako), is a Malayic Dayak language of Borneo. The exact number of speakers remains unknown, but is estimated to be around 350,000.

The name Kendayan is preferred in Kalimantan, Indonesia, and Salako in Sarawak, Malaysia. Other dialects of Kendayan include Ahe, Banana and Belangin. Speakers of any of the dialects can understand speakers of any of the others.

Language context 

Salako is spoken in the state of Sarawak in Malaysia and the province of West Kalimantan in Indonesia. There are speakers in Sambas and Bengkayang Regencies and in Singkawang. Other dialects are spoken in the Pontianak, Bengkawang and Landak Regencies of West Kalimantan.

It is said that Singkawang in southern Sambas is the place of origin of Salako speakers.

Dialects spoken in West Kalimantan have been influenced by the Indonesian, which is the national language of Indonesia. This is the language used in official contexts, schools, the media and in church. In Sarawak, the influence of Malay has been less significant, as it became the national language more recently.

Kendayan is a vital language that is used in the community and at home. The Ahe variety is also spoken as a lingua franca among Dayak speakers. However, younger speakers are typically educated through Indonesian away from the villages, which could affect language vitality in the future.

Comparison with other neighbouring languages

References

Further reading 
 Adelaar, K. Alexander. 2005. Salako or Badamea: Sketch Grammar, Text and Lexicon of a Kanayatn Dialect in West Borneo. (Frankfurter Forschungen zu Südostasien, 2.) Wiesbaden: Harrassowitz.
 Alexander Adelaar. 2006. Where does Belangin belong?. In Fritz Schulze and Holger Warnk (eds.), Insular Southeast Asia: Linguistic and cultural studies in Honour of Bernd Nothofer, 65–84. Wiesbaden: Harrassowitz.
 Burkhardt, Jey Lingam. 2007. Group interaction patterns as observed in informal learning events among pre-literate/semi-literate Salako women.
 Dunselman, Donatus. 1949, 1949, 1950. Bijdrage tot de kennis van de taal en adat der Kendajan Dajaks van West-Borneo. Bijdragen tot de Taal-, Land- en Volkenkunde van Nederlandsch-Indië 105, 105, 106. 59–105, 147–218, 321–371.
 Hermann, Paulus. 1988. A contrastive study on Kendayan and English consonants for the prediction of pronunciation difficulties. MA Thesis, Department of English, Faculty of Arts and Letters, Teaching Training College (IKIP), Yogyakarta.
 Hudson, Alfred B. 1970. A Note on Selako: Malayic Dayak and Land Dayak Languages in Western Borneo. Sarawak Museum Journal 18. 301–318.
 Lansau, Donatos. 1981. Struktur bahasa Kendayan. Jakarta: Pusat Pembinaan dan Pengemban gan Bahasa, Departemen Pendidikan dan Kebudayaan.
 Joseph, Thomas. 1984. Morfologi dan sintaksis bahasa Kendayan. Jakarta: Pusat Pembinaan dan Pengemban gan Bahasa, Departemen Pendidikan dan Kebudayaan.
 Sukamto. 1993. Tata bahasa Kendayan. Jakarta: Pusat Pembinaan dan Pengemban gan Bahasa, Departemen Pendidikan dan Kebudayaan.

External links
Portions of the Book of Common Prayer for Salako speakers, digitized by Richard Mammana and Charles Wohlers

Ibanic languages
Languages of Malaysia
Languages of Indonesia
Agglutinative languages